Kuso is a 2017 American body horror surrealist comedy anthology film directed by Flying Lotus (credited as Steve), who co-wrote the screenplay with David Firth and Zack Fox.

Plot 
Kuso depicts a series of four surreal vignettes about the mutated survivors of an earthquake that has destroyed Los Angeles. The vignettes are broken up throughout the film by animations, television static, and news reporters reporting on the earthquake; the news report is initially interrupted by Busdriver, who performs a jazz-spoken word number describing the earthquake.

Royal 
 Written by Steven Ellison
Missy and Kenneth are lovers who live in an apartment complex. On their first appearance, Missy is seen choking Kenneth as he masturbates, then singing him to sleep. However, Missy covers her neck with a cloth, and refuses to let Kenneth perform sexual acts on her. Kenneth attempts to play the piano for her to sing, but another voice joins them; Missy finally removes the cloth to reveal a talking boil on her neck. After initial revulsion, the boil talks Kenneth into letting it perform fellatio on him; he agrees, and they do so. Afterward, Kenneth responds in pleasure, having learned to enjoy the boil's presence, and names it Royal.

Mr. Quiggle 
 Written by Steven Ellison and Zack Fox
Up-and-coming rapper B lives in an apartment with interdimensional creatures Kazo and Mazu. After smoking from a bong and watching what appears to be a snuff film with them, B goes to the bathroom to take a pregnancy test but is forced to hide it when Phil, a man who raped B and got her pregnant, appears through her toilet. Having tested positive, B goes to Dr. Clinton's clinic for an abortion, where she meets Manuel, who is cured of his fear of breasts by Mr. Quiggle, a large bug living in Clinton's anus. B is offered a coat hanger for her abortion and leaves in disgust. She visits Phil to tell him she is pregnant, but Phil refuses to let her get an abortion; Kazo and Mazu subdue Phil and trap him within one of B's music videos. They then remove the fetus from B's body, and B suggests that they smoke the fetus.

Smear 
 Written by Steven Ellison
Charlie is a small man who goes to an exclusive school in the forest and is fed terrible food by his mother, which causes him to constantly need to defecate. Laughed out of his classroom for doing so in his pants, Charlie runs into the forest, where he finds a strange creature with only an anus-like orifice with a worm-like tongue. He feeds the creature some of his feces, which causes it to apparently evolve, growing a face in place of its tongue. On their second meeting, the creature transfers a beam of green light to Charlie's head, empowering him to stop going to school and overcome his mother at last. Charlie later feeds the creature dog feces, which causes it and its apparent offspring to vanish, leaving Charlie and the dog standing in the forest.

Sock 
 Written by David Firth and Steven Ellison
Angel, a woman crawling on the ground and eating concrete, tells herself she needs to sacrifice her baby. The voice of God speaks to her and tells her that her baby is missing and she will find it down a hole that she claims leads to Hell. Angel crawls into the hole, but slips and falls all the way down. She witnesses another man being consumed by a creature in the hole and is yelled at by Jenny, an inhabitant of the hole world. Angel is swallowed by another creature in the hole; she travels down a long, surreal tunnel, before coming up out of the ground inside a creature similar to the one from Smear, witnessing a large object flying over Los Angeles.

After the credits, Busdriver performs another spoken-word piece about surviving the earthquake.

Cast 

Royal
Iesha Coston as Missy
Oumi Zumi as Kenneth
David Firth as Royal (voice)
Mr. Quiggle
The Buttress as B
Zack Fox as Manuel
Hannibal Buress as Kazo (voice)
Kewon Vines as Kazo (performance)
Tim Heidecker as Phil
Donnell Rawlings as Mazu (voice)
Matt McCarthy as Mazu (performance)
Diana Terranova as Pepper
Manuel Vazquez as Julia
Lexington Steele as Jody
George Clinton as Doctor Clinton
Guru Singh and Jimmy ScreamerClauz as patients
Smear
Shane Carpenter as Charlie
Angel Deradoorian as Charlie (voice)
Sandra R. Kisling as Michelle
Anders Holm as Teacher
Sock
Mali Matsuda as Angel
Pretty Ricki Fontaine as Jenny
David Firth as Roach Man
Bob Heslip as Bob
Byron Bowers as Smoking Roach
Additional cast
Regan Farquhar as News Pirate
Hugh Moore as Anchor 1
Jen Saunderson as Anchor 2
Krista Allen as Weathergirl

Music 

The film features a score by Flying Lotus alongside British electronic musician Aphex Twin and Japanese composer Akira Yamaoka. A number of other musicians contributed to, or played on the score, including Thundercat, Kamasi Washington, Miguel Atwood-Ferguson, Dennis Hamm, Dante Winslow, Niki Randa, Brandon Coleman, Busdriver, The Buttress, and Angel Deradoorian, the latter three of which also perform in the film. A soundtrack album is forthcoming with no known date of release.

Release 
The film premiered at Sundance Film Festival on January 21, 2017. The film was reported to have many people leaving during the screening, with Flying Lotus later stating that "only like 20 people out of like 400" walked out.

In June 2017, Flying Lotus announced that Kuso will be released on Shudder on July 21, alongside a limited theatrical release.

References

External links
 
 
 

American independent films
2017 films
2017 black comedy films
2017 comedy horror films
American black comedy films
American horror anthology films
American avant-garde and experimental films
American disaster films
American comedy horror films
American science fiction horror films
Apocalyptic films
American body horror films
Films about earthquakes
2010s avant-garde and experimental films
2010s English-language films
2010s American films